Lori L. Lake (born February 9, 1960) is an American writer of fiction, mainly about lesbian protagonists. She is also an editor, writing instructor, and former publisher.

Personal life
Lake was born in Portland, Oregon, the oldest of five daughters, and spent her early years with her family in Seattle and Portland, then lived with an aunt and uncle in Tigard, Oregon, during her teen years and graduated from Tigard High School in 1978. She graduated from Portland's Lewis and Clark College in 1983 with a double major in English and Political Science and moved to the Twin Cities with her partner shortly after. She attended Saint Paul's Hamline University where she studied with Carol Bly and in 1989 received a Masters of Arts in Liberal Studies with an emphasis on Literature and Ethics. After working in Saint Paul in county government for nearly two decades, she quit in 2003 to work on writing and teaching. In 2009 Lake returned to her hometown in Oregon after a breakup with her partner of 27 years.

Writing career
Her work includes The Gun Series police novels, The Public Eye Mystery Series, four standalone drama/romances, two short story collections, the Lambda Literary finalist anthology The Milk of Human Kindness, and the World War II novel Snow Moon Rising, which won the 2007 Ann Bannon Popular Choice Award, a Goldie from the Golden Crown Literary Society, and The Alice B Readers Award. In concert with fellow writer/editor Jessie Chandler, Lake also won a 2016 Golden Crown Literary Award for the anthology Lesbians on the Loose: Crime Writers on the Lam.

In recent years, Lake has become a mentor and coach to many young and aspiring writers, especially through her work at The Loft Literary Center, the Portland Lesbian Writers Group, and the Oregon Writers Colony, and in her work as an organizer of writing retreats or as program director of literary conferences, particularly for the Golden Crown Literary Society from which she received the Directors' Award in 2012 for her co-founding the organization and coordinating conferences and events from 2004 to 2012. Lake also commenced publishing the work of others in 2014 upon opening Launch Point Press in Portland, Oregon. Citing time constraints, Lake sold Launch Point Press to new owners who assumed ownership in January, 2023, leaving Lake time to write once more.

Novels

 Gun Shy: Book 1 in The Gun Series (2001)
 Ricochet in Time (2001)
 Under the Gun: Book 2 in The Gun Series (2002)
 Different Dress (2003)
 Have Gun We'll Travel: Book 3 in The Gun Series (2005)
 Snow Moon Rising (2006)
 Like Lovers Do (2011)
 Buyer's Remorse: Book 1 in The Public Eye Series (2011)
 A Very Public Eye: Book 2 in The Public Eye Series (2012)
 Jump The Gun: Book 4 in The Gun Series (2013)
 Eight Dates: A Romance (2014)
 Gun Shy: The 20th Anniversary Edition (2019)
 Adventures Unlimited (forthcoming, 2023)
 Strays (forthcoming, 2023)

Short story collections
 Stepping Out: Short Stories (2004)
 Shimmer & Other Stories (2007)
 A Cold Dish: Stories of Vengeance (forthcoming, 2023)

Nonfiction
 Sparking Creativity: Words of Wisdom to Inspire Your Writing Craft—Book One in The Writer's Odyssey Series (forthcoming, 2023)

Anthologies Edited
 The Milk of Human Kindness: Lesbian Authors Write about Mothers & Daughters (2004)
 Romance For Life (2005)
 Lesbians on the Loose: Crime Writers on the Lam (2015)
 Time's Rainbow: Writing Ourselves Back Into American History - Volume I (2016)
 Time's Rainbow: Writing Ourselves Back Into World History - Volume II (forthcoming)

Story Contributions to Anthologies
 "Take Me Out" in Silence of the Loons (2005)
 "Paige" in Best Lesbian Romance (2006)
 "Jumping Over My Head" in Toe to Toe: Standing Tall and Proud (2008)
 "Den of Iniquity" in Once Upon A Crime (2009)
 "The Penthouse Birthday" in Women in Uniform: Medics & Soldiers & Cops, Oh My! (2010)
 "Den of Iniquity" in Women of the Mean Streets: Lesbian Noir (2011)
 "A Darker Side of Green" in Writes of Spring (2012)
 "An Age Old Solution" in Minnesota Crime Wave Presents Fifteen Tales of Murder, Mayhem & Suspense (2012)
 "An Age Old Solution" in Lesbians on the Loose: Crime Writers on the Lam (2015)
 "Bayard" in Time's Rainbow: Writing Ourselves Back Into History (2016)
 "Kitchen Matters" in Cooked to Death: Lying on a Plate (2017)
 "Kindred Spirits" in Dark Side of the Loon: Where History Meets Mystery (2018)
 "Dog Eat Dog World" in Learning Curve: An Anthology of Lessons Learned (2018)
 "Writing to Wes" in Now We Heal: An Anthology of Hope (2020)

Awards and recognition
 2016 - Golden Crown Literary Award Winner - Fiction Anthology Category co-edited with Jessie Chandler: Lesbians on the Loose: Crime Writers on the Lam
 2014 - Rainbow Award Winner - Best Comedic Romance: Eight Dates
 2014 - Rainbow Award Runner-Up - Best Overall Lesbian Novel: Eight Dates
 2014 - Rainbow Award Winner - Best Comedic Romance: Eight Dates
 2014 - Golden Crown Literary Award Finalist - Mystery/Thriller Category: Jump The Gun: Book 4 in The Gun Series
 2013 - Rainbow Award First Runner-Up - Best Lesbian Mystery/Thriller: Jump The Gun: Book 4 in The Gun Series
 2013 - Golden Crown Literary Award Finalist - Mystery/Thriller Category: A Very Public Eye: Book 2 in The Public Eye Mystery Series
 2013 - Ann Bannon Popular Choice Award Finalist - A Very Public Eye: Book 2 in The Public Eye Mystery Series
 2012 - Golden Crown Literary Award Winner - Mystery/Thriller Category: Buyer's Remorse: Book 1 in The Public Eye Mystery Series
 2011 - Golden Crown Literary Society's Directors' Award - For service to the GCLS 2004-2011
 2011 - American Fiction Book Awards (formerly USA Best Books) Gay & Lesbian Fiction Finalist - Like Lovers Do
 2007 - Golden Crown Literary Award Winner - Best Dramatic Fiction: Snow Moon Rising
 2007 - Ann Bannon Popular Choice Award - Snow Moon Rising
 2007 - Alice B Readers Award - Snow Moon Rising
 2007 - LJ Maas Memorial Mentoring Award
 2007 - Lesbian Fiction Readers Choice Award - Snow Moon Rising
 2007 - Golden Crown Literary Award Finalist - Anthology Category: Romance For Life
 2007 - Lesbian Fiction Readers Choice Award - Romance For Life
 2006 - Golden Crown Literary Award Finalist - Mystery/Thriller Category: Have Gun We'll Travel
 2005 - Lambda Literary Award Finalist - Anthology Category: The Milk of Human Kindness
 2003 - Lavender Magazine's Twin Cities Outstanding GLBT Author
 2003 - Girlfriend Magazine August "Girlfriend of the Month"
 2003 - StoneWall Society Winner - Fact & Fable Award - Gun Shy
 2002 - Lavender Magazine's Twin Cities Outstanding GLBT Author

References

External links
  Publisher's home page
  The Booklover's Companion with CA Farlow & Edith Zeitlberger (podcast)
  Talking Romance & Crime with Lori L. Lake (podcast)
  Portland Lesbian Writers Group
  Oregon Writers Colony
 Once Upon A Crime anthology home page
  The Loft Literary Center
  Golden Literary Society
  Alice B Readers Award
 American Fiction Book Awards (formerly USA Best Book Awards)

1960 births
Living people
21st-century American novelists
American mystery writers
American women short story writers
American women novelists
American lesbian writers
Lewis & Clark College alumni
Hamline University alumni
Women mystery writers
Writers from Portland, Oregon
American LGBT novelists
21st-century American women writers
21st-century American short story writers
Novelists from Oregon
Novelists from Minnesota
People from Tigard, Oregon